John Patrick O'Brien (February 1, 1873September 22, 1951) was an Irish-American politician who served as the 98th Mayor of New York City from January 1 to December 31, 1933.

Life and career
O'Brien was born on February 1, 1873, to Mary and Patrick O'Brien, Irish immigrants in Massachusetts. He received his B.A. from College of the Holy Cross and his masters and law degree from Georgetown University. He later served as New York City Corporation Counsel and as a New York Surrogate Court judge.

Shortly after the surprise resignation of Mayor Jimmy Walker in 1932, Tammany Hall nominated O'Brien for mayor in a special election, and he beat write-in candidate (and Acting Mayor) Joseph V. McKee by more than half a million votes. O'Brien's inauguration was held in the Hall of Records, at 31 Chambers Street in Manhattan, and was devoid of the pageantry that had greeted many of his predecessors. His inauguration speech did not outline a vision for the city, but rather, reflected on the work of the court and the legal profession in general.  In the post inauguration news conference, the new mayor was asked who would be the new police commissioner.  "I don't know," O'Brien answered.  "They haven't told me yet."

Although he is credited with expanding the city's ability to collect taxes, restoring order to the city's finances, and trimming the budget, O'Brien was defeated for re-election in a three-way race by the colorful Republican-City Fusion Party candidate, Fiorello H. La Guardia, in November 1933. He served just one year in office.

O'Brien returned to his legal work and served three times as a delegate to the Democratic National Convention. He died on September 21, 1951, at his home at 40 East 75th Street at 7:25 p.m. He was buried in the Gate of Heaven Cemetery in Westchester County.

Family

O'Brien married Helen E. C. Madigan (c1875-1950) in 1908 and their children include: Gerard J. O'Brien, James A. O'Brien, Lawrence J. O'Brien, John G. O'Brien, and a daughter who married Victor E. Forker.

See also
List of mayors of New York City

References
Notes

External links
New York City biography

1873 births
1951 deaths
20th-century American politicians
American Roman Catholics
Burials at Gate of Heaven Cemetery (Hawthorne, New York)
American people of Irish descent
Mayors of New York City
Georgetown University Law Center alumni
New York (state) Democrats
People from Massachusetts